Faristenia maritimella is a moth in the family Gelechiidae. It is found in the Russian Far East.

References

Faristenia
Moths described in 1991